The 2014 Ronde van Drenthe World Cup was the 8th running of the women's Ronde van Drenthe World Cup, a women's bicycle race in the Netherlands.

In the final of the race Anna van der Breggen and Iris Slappendel rode away from the chasing group. 16 km before the finish, after riding the VAM mountain for the last time, Van der Breggen rode away from Slappendel. Van der Breggen got an advantage of over 1' 30" on the chasing group. It was the Dutch Ellen van Dijk from Boels–Dolmans Cycling Team who closed about the whole gap and launched teammate Lizzie Armitstead, who rode to Van der Breggen. Armitstead outsprinted Van der Breggen in the final and won the race. Armitstead said after the race that it was her best achievement after winning silver at the 2012 Summer Olympics and thanked Van Dijk for chasing down Van der Breggen.

Results

References

External links
  

Ronde van Drenthe (women's race)
Ronde van Drenthe World Cup
Ronde van Drenthe World Cup